2020 K League may refer to:

 2020 K League 1 (1st Division)
 2020 K League 2 (2nd Division)